Coumarinolignoids are phenolic compounds formed from  a lignan structure with a coumarin formed in place of one of the two phenylpropanoids.

Examples 
 2-(4-hydroxy-3,5-dimethoxyphenyl)-3-hydroxymethyl-2,3-dihydro-1,4,5-trioxaphenanthren-6-one can be found on Paullinia pinnata
 5'-hydroxycleomiscosin B, found in Eurycorymbus cavaleriei
 5-Methoxypropacin found in Protium unifoliolatum
 Moluccanin, found in Aleurites moluccanus
 Aleuritin, found in Aleurites fordii
 Durantin A and repenins, isolated from Duranta

References